Shonen Knife is a 1990 release by Shonen Knife compiling their first two albums, Burning Farm (1983) and Yama-no Attchan (1984), for the US market. It was released with an accompanying booklet containing the names of each song translated from Japanese to English.

Track listing
"Watchin’ Girl"
"Banana Fish"
"Miracles"
"Parallel Woman"
"Twist Barbie"
"Elephant Pao Pao"
"Tortoise Brand Pot Scrubbing Cleaner’s Theme"
"Animal Song"
"A Day At The Factory"
"Burning Farm"
"An Angel Has Come"
"Cycling Is Fun"
"Elmar Elevator"
"Banana Leaf"
"Chinese Song"
"Flying Jelly Attack"
"Cannibal Papaya"
"Dali’s Sunflower"
"Insect Collector"
"Bye Bye"
"Parrot Polynesia"

References

1990 compilation albums
Shonen Knife compilation albums